Bullialdus may refer to:

 Bullialdus (crater), a lunar impact crater
 Ismaël Bullialdus (1605-1694), French astronomer